Manuterge is the name given by the Roman Catholic Church to the towel used by the priest when engaged liturgically.

Description
There are two kinds of manuterges. One serves the needs of the sacristy. The priest uses this at the washing of hands before mass, before distributing Communion outside of Mass, and before administering baptism. It can also be used for drying the hands after they have been washed on occasions not prescribed by the rubrics, but still customary after Mass. There are no prescriptions as to material and form for the towel used in the sacristy. It is usual to have it hanging over a roller, the two ends being sewn together so as to make it into a circular band. The custom of washing the hands before Mass may date from Early Christian tradition since the ceremony is expressly mentioned in the sacramentaries of the ninth and tenth centuries.

The other manuterge is used in the Mass for drying both the hands at the Lavabo, an action performed by the priest after the Offertory as he recites the psalm, "Lavabo", and also by the bishop before the Offertory and after the Communion. It is kept on the credence table with the finger-bowl and cruets. There are no ecclesiastical regulations regarding the form and material of this manuterge. The towel, which is used after the Offertory during the recital of the psalm "Lavabo", is usually small (18 in. by 14 in.), only the points of the thumb and two fingers, and not the whole hand, being usually washed. It usually has lace or embroidery at the ends.

References

Eucharistic objects
Catholic liturgy
Linens